Plesiopinae is one of two subfamilies in the family Plesiopidae, the longfins or roundheads.

Characteristics
They have scales on the gill covers and these frequently extend to the top of their heads. The dorsal fin has between 11 and 15 spines and 6 and 21 soft rays, the anal fin has 3 spines and between 7 and 23 soft rayes while the pelvic fin has a single spine and 4 soft rays.

Genera
The following gerbera are classified under the Plesiopinae:

 Assessor Whitley, 1935
 Calloplesiops Fowler & B.A. Bean, 1930
 Fraudella Whitley, 1935
 Paraplesiops Bleeker, 1875
 Plesiops Oken, 1817
 Steeneichthys Allen & Randall, 1985
 Trachinops Günther, 1861

References

 
Plesiopidae
Fish subfamilies
Taxa named by Albert Günther